Jean Kerléo (born 24 February 1932) is a French perfumer who worked in-house of Jean Patou and is also the founder of the Osmothèque, a scent archive in Versailles. Kerleo was born on 24 February 1932 in Brittany, France. At age 22, he began making perfumes for a New York City company, Helena Rubenstein. He received the Prix des Parfumeurs de France in 1965, served as the president for the Society of French Perfumers from 1976 to 1979, and was awarded the Prix François COTY in 2001

From 1967 until 1998, Kerléo was the in-house perfumer for the house of Jean Patou, the second in line after Henri Alméras, where he composed the influential perfumes 1000 and Sublime. In 1999, he passed his position of head perfumer of Jean Patou to Jean-Michel Duriez and became the director of the Osmothèque, which he co-founded. In this position, he supervised, researched, and extended the collection of this fragrance archive to encompass and reconstruct more ancient and lost perfumes. In 2008, he handed the position of president and director to Patricia de Nicolaï, the great-granddaughter of Pierre-François Pascal Guerlain.

Creations for Jean Patou
Lacoste Eau de Sport (1967, for men; discontinued)
1000 (1972)
Eau de Patou (1976) 
Patou pour Homme (1980, for men; discontinued)
Ma Liberté (1987, discontinued)
Sublime (1992)
Patou pour Homme Privé (1994, for men; discontinued)
Voyageur (1995)

In 1984, Jean Kerléo was responsible for the recreation of 12 iconic Patou fragrances of the early decades: Amour-Amour, Que sais-je, Adieu Sagesse, Chaldée, Moment Suprême, Cocktail, Divine Folie, Normandie, Vacances, Colony, L'Heure Attendue, Câline.  Very much in the spirit of his later work at the Osmothèque, he restricted himself to those fragrances he could confidently reassemble based on existing formulas and available ingredients, avoiding guesswork where such reference material was not available. For this reason, many classic Patou fragrances were not recreated.

References

French perfumers
Living people
1932 births